Ronald Lee Harper is a Canadian provincial politician. He served as the Saskatchewan New Democratic Party member of the Legislative Assembly of Saskatchewan for the constituency of Regina Northeast. He was first elected in 1991 in the constituency of Pelly, but narrowly defeated in 1995 in the new constituency of Canora-Pelly. He returned to the Legislature in 1999 when he won the constituency of Regina Northeast and was re-elected in 2003 and 2007.

Notes

Living people
Saskatchewan New Democratic Party MLAs
1948 births
21st-century Canadian politicians